Scott Eugene Valentine (born June 3, 1958) is an American actor, best known for his role as Nick Moore on the series Family Ties.

Life and career
Valentine was born in Saratoga Springs, New York, the son of Beverly Ann (née Hanna) and Edward Eugene Valentine. He began to pursue acting one year into his college education, attending the American Academy of Dramatic Arts in New York City. He completed the three-year program in one and a half years. He got as far as a screen test for the film The Lords of Discipline when he was hit, run over, and dragged by a truck on September 17, 1981 and his career was halted for three years as he recovered. He moved to Los Angeles and landed a recurring role on the TV series Family Ties as Nick Moore, the loveable but dim-witted boyfriend of Mallory Keaton from 1985 to 1989, for seasons 4 through 7.

During an interview for Montreal radio station CJAD, Valentine thought the role was not challenging enough for the money he was receiving, saying: "I'm so glad I went to the American Academy of Dramatic Arts and to all the other fine acting institutions so I could grunt on primetime television. The primal dig, the date from hell. It was a lot of fun, but literally there were times where I only had to utter two guttural utterances in a show and they paid me a bundle of cash for it. I felt bad at times."

Valentine's success as Nick Moore on Family Ties led to three separate spin-offs. The first starred Valentine and actor Herschel Bernardi called Taking It Home. Filming was canceled when Bernardi died in 1986. The second spin-off placed Valentine's character in a Friends-like environment in New York City. The third was a pilot episode for a spin-off titled The Art of Being Nick; the episode aired once and co-starred Julia Louis-Dreyfus. "It came in number two and they still didn't pick it up," recalled Valentine.

He has appeared since then as a guest actor in several hit television series such as CSI: NY, NewsRadio, and JAG; his first major motion picture, My Demon Lover; and numerous TV and straight-to-video movies. He also voiced The Phantom in Phantom 2040. He portrayed Metallo in an episode of Lois & Clark: The New Adventures of Superman TV series.

Personal life
On September 29, 1985, in Los Angeles, Valentine married actress Kym Denyse (Fisher) Stephenson. Valentine and Stephenson divorced February 14, 2012. Valentine has four sons from the marriage; Trevin John (1986), Shayler Stephenson (1988), Jesstin Jay-Owen (1992) and Caden Edward (1998). 

On November 7, 2021 Valentine married Jennifer Wood (née Malchow), another Saratoga Springs native, in their hometown of Saratoga Springs.  

Valentine is a partner in Excelsior Capital Partners, a boutique investment firm that focuses on the renewable and sustainable energy sector.

Filmography

Films

Television

References

External links

1958 births
Living people
American male film actors
American male television actors
American male voice actors
People from Saratoga Springs, New York